Tephritis dudichi is a species of tephritid or fruit flies in the genus Tephritis of the family Tephritidae.

Distribution
Switzerland, Romania, Ukraine, north Caucasus.

References

Tephritinae
Insects described in 1939
Diptera of Asia